Congregation of B'nai Israel Synagogue in Augusta, Georgia, is the oldest standing synagogue in Georgia. Dedicated in 1869, it is a rare example of a Greek-style synagogue. The synagogue is a contributing property of the Augusta Downtown Historic District on the National Register of Historic Places.

Restoration Efforts 
In 2015, the City of Augusta had proposed demolishing the Synagogue and the neighboring former Court of Ordinary building with plans to develop more parking for the Municipal Building located next door to the Synagogue.

Soon after the proposal went public, the local Jewish community in Augusta, led by local historian Jack Steinberg, as well as many other citizens concerned about the proposed demolition worked to form a coalition working towards the goal of saving the structures as well as restoring them to become the home of a new Augusta Jewish Museum.

The efforts convinced local leaders to ditch the plans for demolition and after that announcement, a new partnership between Historic Augusta and the local Jewish community was formed with plans for the restoration of the building.

In July 2021, the construction was completed on the Court of the Ordinary building. A dedication ceremony was held for the building commemorating the official opening of Phase One of the project which included attendees from local government leaders to representatives from the Jewish community and Historic Augusta as well.

The Augusta Jewish Museum now reflects on the history of the Jewish community in the Augusta area and includes exhibits on the Holocaust and Israel.

See also
Jewish history in Colonial America

References

External links
Augusta Jewish Museum website
Encyclopedia of Southern Jewish Communities 

Religious organizations established in 1869
Jewish museums in the United States
Synagogues on the National Register of Historic Places in Georgia (U.S. state)
Greek Revival architecture in Georgia (U.S. state)
Greek Revival synagogues
Synagogues in Georgia (U.S. state)
Reform synagogues in Georgia (U.S. state)
Sephardi Jewish culture in the United States
Sephardi Reform Judaism
National Register of Historic Places in Richmond County, Georgia
1869 establishments in Georgia (U.S. state)